Bizcocho ( or ) is the name given in the Spanish-speaking world to a wide range of pastries, cakes or cookies. The exact product to which the word bizcocho is applied varies widely depending on the region and country. For instance, in Spain bizcocho is exclusively used to refer to sponge cake. In Uruguay, most buttery flaky pastry including croissants are termed bizcocho, whilst sponge cake is called bizcochuelo. In Chile, the Dominican Republic and Bolivia bizcocho refers to a sweet dough (masa) baked with local ingredients, similar to the bizcocho from Spain. In Ecuador the dough of a bizcocho can either be sweet or salty. The US state New Mexico is unusual in using the diminutive form of the name, bizcochito, as the name for a locally developed and very popular cookie.

History 
The word sponge cake comes from the Latin , which means "cooked twice", that is why it was often soaked in wine, due to the low humidity it had.

The Uruguayan sponge cake is frequently related to the German pastry. It is argued that it is a derivative of krapfen, which was brought by the German immigration that went to the Río de la Plata region.

According to other versions, however, the origin of the cake would be the fusion of French and Spanish bakeries, as evidenced by the accounts of colonial Montevideo by Isidoro de María and the genealogical studies of Juan Alejandro Apolant and Ricardo Goldaracena. From these studies and publications it appears that the first bakers in Montevideo came from France and Spain, as documented in the immigration records of the first settlers in which their profession is recorded. In fact, the puff pastry croissant, one of the varieties of sponge cake, was invented in France and its first recipe dates back to 1905.

Types of bizcochos

Some of the most usual types of bizcochos are:

Bizcochito: A cookie flavored with anise and cinnamon developed in the Spanish colonial province of Santa Fe de Nuevo México, roughly corresponding to the US state New Mexico in the present day.
Bizcocho de soletilla: The name given in Spain to ladyfinger biscuits.
Croasanes  or croissants: Croissants are called bizcocho in Uruguay. Sweet croasanes can be filled with chocolate, pastry cream, dulce de membrillo (a sweet quince paste), or dulce de leche, savoury with cheese, ham or salami. 
Galletas dulces  or : A descendant of the pastry known as galleta, galleta de campaña or galleta con grasa. Galletas dulces have a layer of caramel and sugar on top and are known as bizcochos in Uruguay
Margaritas: They are a variation of croissants found both in Uruguay and Argentina.  The ends are joined together, leaving some space in the middle for a sweet filling (pastry cream, dulce de membrillo or dulce de leche). They have sugar on top of the pastry and the filling. Margaritas get their name from the flower they resemble (a daisy, known in Spanish as "margarita").
Ojitos : A kind of round cookie with a space in the middle filled with dulce de membrillo, also from Uruguay.
Pan con grasa: Another kind of bizcocho found in Uruguay, is a type of bread, also known as the cañón.
Polvorones : Another kind of cookie that can be plain, flavoured with cocoa, or made with half plain dough and half cocoa flavoured. Polvorones originated in Spain.
Sponge cake: Sponge cake is called bizcocho in Spain. It may be  made with chocolate, lemon, yoghurt, etc.
Vigilantes : Another sweet variation of croissants. They are long and thin, with sugar on top.

By country

Costa Rica
In Costa Rica, bizcochos are made with masa, spices, and/or cheese. They are eaten as a snack, especially during coffee breaks.

Mexico
In Mexico, bizcocho is commonly used as a synonym for pan dulce. It can also be used as a flirtatious compliment to a good looking woman or, less commonly, a handsome man ("Goodbye, bizcocho!"). In some parts, however, it is a very vulgar term, referring to a person's genitals (mainly female) and not used in polite company.

Uruguay
Bizcochos are one of the most intrinsic traditions of the Uruguayan culture. They are the inseparable "companions" of mate, coffee, café con leche, or tea for breakfast or the merienda (afternoon tea). They are also common in meetings with friends, especially those taking place in parks, squares, beaches or along the coastline in ramblas (an avenue bordering the coast with pedestrian areas on each side) such as the ones in Montevideo.

Bizcochos are sold not only at panaderías (bakeries), but also at specialized shops called bizcocherías.

Puerto Rico (U.S.)
Any type of cake, unless otherwise having a specific name (example: tres leches), is termed a bizcocho.

See also

 List of cakes
 List of cookies
 List of pastries

References

Cakes
Latin American cuisine
Spanish pastries
Desserts